Ollie Potter (born 1900 in Louisville, Kentucky – 16 August 1953 Manhattan, New York) was an American female blues singer, notably of Cleveland and New York City, and a dancer, particularly of the shimmy style.

Career 
Potter flourished regionally in Cleveland during the prohibition, on into the Great Depression, from the late 1920s, then relocated in Harlem, Manhattan, beginning around 1934, performing through the early 1950s with Art Tatum, Dickie Wells, Willie "the Lion" Smith, Ollie Shepard, and others.  She made very few recordings — an extant four — but had been acclaimed by various musicologists and critics for one in particular — a 1941 amateur recording with Art Tatum and other singers at "Gee-Haw Stables," in Harlem.  That particular recording was not released until 1971.  In 1934, Marcus Wright, columnist for the New York Age stated that she was one of Harlem's favorite entertainers.

Potter performed with Bob Hope

Death 
Potter was admitted to the Sydenham Hospital in June 1953.  After a long illness, she died August 16, 1953, in Manhattan.

Selected venues and collaborators 
 Rainbow Palm Gardens, 427 Indiana Ave, Indianapolis, 1928
 In October 1932, Potter performed at the Plaza Club in Cleveland
 In January 1933, Potter was performing at the Creole Kitchen (aka Creole Club) in Cleveland, acclaimed that year by the Pittsburgh Courier as one of the "Hottest Nite Spots In The Entire Country;" Mammy Louise Brooks (1882–1960) was the manager
 In October 1933, Potter, billed as a torch singer, was performing at the Paramount Inn, in Harlem, owned by Joe Rubin.  The club admitted whites only. The floor show included singers Jimmy Hays and Edith King; Johnny Perchey, snakehips dancer; and a female sextet chorus.  All shows were produced by Billy Maxey, who also emceed the show. Music was furnished by Sherdena Walker (1904–1982) and Her Orchestra.
 Beginning January 27, 1934. for week at the Lafayette Theatre in Harlem, Potter was a featured stage celebrity in a new musical review staged by Addison Carey (1900–1952); other celebrities included Doris Rheubottom (born 1905) (vocalist), the Three Yorkers, Dewey Brown, George Wiltshire, and George Gee James.
 December 1934, Potter was singing at the Poospatuck Club in Sugar Hill, Harlem; a New York Age review lauded her rendition of "Love In Bloom"
 In December 1935, nationally syndicated columnist Allan W McMillan (1900–1991) wrote "Someone ought to give Ollie Potter (God's gift to the blues) an opportunity on Broadway."
 On February 28, 1935, the second edition of the New Harlem Revels, directed by Rubberlegs Williams, debuted at Dickie Wells Harlem Supper Club.  Potter was among the featured artists.
 In June 1936, Potter resigned from Dickie Wells Hot Spot to perform at the Poospatuck Club
 Potter debuted at the Elks Rendezvous in Harlem, 464 Lenox Avenue, in February 1939, in a musical review singing "That's Why I Am In Harlem Every Night," which was well received by the audience.
 Willie "The Lion" Smith, featuring Ollie Potter, Suburban Gardens, Washington, D.C. 1939
 Apollo Bar (at 125th Street and 7th Avenue, steps from the Apollo Theater), Harlem, Sunday, May 14, 1950, with Laurel Watson (born around 1913)

Extant discography 
 Ollie Shepard, vocalist
 Accompanied by Stafford "Pazuza" Simon (tenor sax)
 (unknown pianist and drummer)
"I'm Stepping Out Tonight"
Ollie Shepard and Ollie Potter, vocalists
Matrix: 67084-A
"You Got Me Wondering" (©1941)
Ollie Shepard (w&m)
Ollie Potter, vocalist
 Matrix: 67085-A
 Recorded January 22, 1940, New York
 Decca De 7805

 Art Tatum, Onyx ORI205
 Art Tatum (piano, vocalist on track 1) Chocolate Williams (bass) Anna Robinson (vocalist 2) Ethel White (vocalist 4) Charlie Shavers (vocalist 5) Ollie Potter (vocalist 6)
 Recorded live "Gee-Haw Stables," New York, July 26 or 27, 1941
 "Toledo Blues" (1)
 "Body and Soul" (cw out), Heyman, Sour, Eyton (words); Green (music)
 "Stardust" (3), Carmichael  (music), Parish (words)
 "Embraceable You" (4), George Gershwin (music), Ira Gershwin (words)
 "I Surrender Dear" (5), Gordon Clifford & Harry Barris (music)
 "There'll Be Some Changes Made" (6), William Blackstone (words) & Benton Overstreet (music) audio

 Ollie Potter
Side A: Ollie Potter and Her After Hours Orchestra
"Too Much E-E-L," by Gerald "Corky" Williams (1896–1950)
Matrix: H-110
<li>: Side B: Ollie Potter and Her Buck Eye Boys
"Big Fat Dollar Bill"
Ollie Potter & Emmett Wallace (1909–2006) (w&m)
Matrix: H-108
Harlem Records 1020 (1945 or 1946)

 Note: Harlem Records was one of several labels founded by J. Mayo Williams; his other labels were Ebony Records, Chicago Record Company, Southern Record Company

Published works 
 "That Fat Dollar Bill"
 Ollie Potter & Emmett Babe Wallace (1909–2006) (words & music)
 (1946)

Marriages 
On November 3, 1931, Variety magazine published that Potter was going to marry Herman Ferdinand (1905–1989) in December 1931.  Potter was, at the time, performing at the Plaza Club in Cleveland and Ferdinand (born February 1, 1881, Russia) was a Cleveland club manager.

Notes and references

General references 
 1936
 Willie the Lion Smith

Notes

Inline citations

Inline citations from New York Age 

American women jazz singers
American jazz singers
Singers from New York City
1900 births
1953 deaths
Date of death unknown
Jazz musicians from New York (state)
20th-century American singers
20th-century American women singers